Historically black colleges and universities (HBCUs) are institutions of higher education in the United States that were established before the Civil Rights Act of 1964 with the intention of primarily serving African Americans.  Most of these institutions were founded during the Reconstruction era and are concentrated in the Southern United States. During the period of racial segregation in the United States, the majority of American institutions of higher education served predominantly white students, and disqualified or limited black American enrollment. Later on some universities, either after expanding their inclusion of Black people and African Americans into their institutions or gaining the status of minority-serving institution, became Predominantly Black Institutions (PBIs).

For a century after the abolition of American slavery in 1865, most colleges and universities in the Southern United States prohibited African Americans from attending, while institutions in other parts of the country regularly employed quotas to limit admissions of Black people. HBCUs were established to provide more opportunities to African Americans and are largely responsible for establishing and expanding the African-American middle class.

There are 101 HBCUs in the United States (of 121 institutions that existed during the 1930s), representing three percent of the nation's colleges, including public and private institutions. 27 offer doctoral programs, 52 offer master's programs, 83 offer bachelor's degree programs, and 38 offer associate degrees. Among the graduates of HBCUs are civil rights leader Martin Luther King Jr., United States Supreme Court Justice Thurgood Marshall, and United States Vice President Kamala Harris.

History

Private institutions
Most HBCUs were established in the South after the American Civil War, often with the assistance of religious missionary organizations based in the northern United States. HBCUs established prior to the American Civil War include Cheyney University of Pennsylvania in 1837, University of the District of Columbia (then known as Miner School for Colored Girls) in 1851, and Lincoln University in 1854. Wilberforce University was also established prior to the American Civil War. The university was founded in 1856 via a collaboration between the African Methodist Episcopal Church of Ohio and the predominantly white Methodist Episcopal Church.

Atlanta University – now Clark Atlanta University – was founded on September 19, 1865, as the first HBCU in the Southern United States. Atlanta University was the first graduate institution to award degrees to African Americans in the nation and the first to award bachelor's degrees to African Americans in the South; Clark College (1869) was the nation's first four-year liberal arts college to serve African-American students. The two consolidated in 1988 to form Clark Atlanta University. Shaw University, founded December 1, 1865, was the second HBCU to be established in the South. The year 1865 also saw the foundation of Storer College (1865–1955) in Harper's Ferry, West Virginia. Storer's former campus and buildings have since been incorporated into Harpers Ferry National Historical Park.

Some of these universities eventually became public universities with assistance form the government.

Public institutions
In 1862, the federal government's Morrill Act provided for land grant colleges in each state. Some educational institutions established under the Morrill Act in the North and West were open to Blacks. But 17 states, almost all in the South, required their post-Civil war systems to be segregated and excluded Black students from their land grant colleges. (In the 1870s, Mississippi, Virginia, and South Carolina each assigned one African American college land-grant status: Alcorn University, Hampton Institute, and Claflin University, respectively.) In response, Congress passed the second Morrill Act of 1890, also known as the Agricultural College Act of 1890, requiring states to establish a separate land grant college for Blacks if Blacks were being excluded from the existing land grant college. Many of the HBCUs were founded by states to satisfy the Second Morrill Act.  These land grant schools continue to receive annual federal funding for their research, extension, and outreach activities.

Predominantly Black Institutions 
Predominantly Black Institutions (PBI) are institutions that do not meet the legal definition of HBCUs, but primarily serve African Americans. Some examples of PBIs are Georgia State University, Trinity Washington University, and the Community College of Philadelphia.

Sports
In the 1920s and 1930s, historically black colleges developed a strong interest in athletics. Sports were expanding rapidly at state universities, but very few black stars were recruited there. Race newspapers  hailed athletic success as a demonstration of racial progress. Black schools hired coaches, recruited and featured stellar athletes, and set up their own leagues.

Jewish refugees
In the 1930s, many Jewish intellectuals fleeing Europe after the rise of Hitler and anti-Jewish legislation in prewar Nazi Germany following Hitler's elevation to power emigrated to the United States and found work teaching in historically black colleges. In particular, 1933 was a challenging year for many Jewish academics who tried to escape increasingly oppressive Nazi policies, particularly after legislation was passed stripping them of their positions at universities. Jews looking outside of Germany could not find work in other European countries because of calamities like the Spanish Civil War and general antisemitism in Europe. In the US, they hoped to continue their academic careers, but barring a scant few, found little acceptance in elite institutions in Depression-era America, which also had their own undercurrent of antisemitism.

As a result of these phenomena, more than two-thirds of the faculty hired at many HBCUs from 1933 to 1945 had come to the United States to escape from Nazi Germany. HBCUs believed the Jewish professors were valuable faculty that would help strengthen their institutions' credibility. HBCUs had a firm belief in diversity and giving opportunity no matter the race, religion, or country of origin. HBCUs were open to Jews because of their ideas of equal learning spaces. They sought to create an environment where all people felt welcome to study, including women.

World War II
HBCUs made substantial contributions to the US war effort. One example is Tuskegee University in Alabama, where the Tuskegee Airmen trained and attended classes.

Florida's black junior colleges
After the landmark Brown v. Board of Education decision of 1954, the legislature of Florida, with support from various counties, opened eleven junior colleges serving the African-American population. Their purpose was to show that separate but equal education was working in Florida. Prior to this, there had been only one junior college in Florida serving African Americans, Booker T. Washington Junior College, in Pensacola, founded in 1949. The new ones were Gibbs Junior College (1957), Roosevelt Junior College (1958), Volusia County Junior College (1958), Hampton Junior College (1958), Rosenwald Junior College (1958), Suwannee River Junior College (1959), Carver Junior College (1960), Collier-Blocker Junior College (1960), Lincoln Junior College (1960), Jackson Junior College (1961), and Johnson Junior College (1962).

The new junior colleges began as extensions of black high schools. They used the same facilities and often the same faculty. Some built their own buildings after a few years. After the passage of the Civil Rights Act of 1964 mandated an end to school segregation, the colleges were all abruptly closed. Only a fraction of the students and faculty were able to transfer to the previously all-white junior colleges, where they found, at best, an indifferent reception.

Since 1965

A reauthorization of the Higher Education Act of 1965 established a program for direct federal grants to HBCUs, to support their academic, financial, and administrative capabilities. Part B specifically provides for formula-based grants, calculated based on each institution's Pell grant eligible enrollment, graduation rate, and percentage of graduates who continue post-baccalaureate education in fields where African Americans are underrepresented. Some colleges with a predominantly black student body are not classified as HBCUs because they were founded (or opened their doors to African Americans) after the implementation of the Sweatt v. Painter (1950) and Brown v. Board of Education (1954) rulings by the U.S. Supreme Court (the court decisions which outlawed racial segregation of public education facilities) and the Higher Education Act of 1965.

In 1980, Jimmy Carter signed an executive order to distribute adequate resources and funds to strengthen the nation's public and private HBCUs. His executive order created the White House Initiative on historically black colleges and universities (WHIHBCU), which is a federally funded program that operates within the U.S. Department of Education. In 1989, George H. W. Bush continued Carter's pioneering spirit by signing Executive Order 12677, which created the presidential advisory board on HBCUs, to counsel the government and the secretary on the future development of these organizations.

Starting in 2001, directors of libraries of several HBCUs began discussions about ways to pool their resources and work collaboratively. In 2003, this partnership was formalized as the HBCU Library Alliance, "a consortium that supports the collaboration of information professionals dedicated to providing an array of resources designed to strengthen historically black colleges and Universities and their constituents."

In 2015, the Bipartisan Congressional Historically Black Colleges and Universities (HBCU) Caucus was established by U.S. Representatives Alma S. Adams and Bradley Byrne. The caucus advocates for HBCUs on Capitol Hill. , there are over 100 elected politicians who are members of the caucus.

Current status

Annually, the U.S. Department of Education designates one week in the fall as "National HBCU Week". During this week, conferences and events are held in Washington, D.C. discussing and celebrating HBCUs, as well as recognizing some notable HBCU scholars and alumni.

As of 2023, Alabama has the most active HBCUs of any state, with 14. North Carolina is second with 11.

In 2015, the share of black students attending HBCUs had dropped to 9% of the total number of black students enrolled in degree-granting institutions nationwide. This figure is a decline from the 13% of black students who enrolled in an HBCU in 2000 and 17% who enrolled in 1980. This is a result of desegregation, rising incomes and increased access to financial aid, which has created more college options for black students.

The percentages of bachelor's and master's degrees awarded to black students by HBCUs has decreased over time. HBCUs awarded 35% of the bachelor's degrees and 21% of the master's degrees earned by blacks in 1976–77, compared with the 14% and 6% respectively of bachelor's and master's degrees earned by blacks in 2014–15. Additionally, the percentage of black doctoral degree recipients who received their degrees from HBCUs was lower in 2014–15 (12%) than in 1976–77 (14%).

The number of total students enrolled at an HBCU rose by 32% between 1976 and 2015, from 223,000 to 293,000. Total enrollment in degree-granting institutions nationwide increased by 81%, from 11 million to 20 million, in the same period.

Although HBCUs were originally founded to educate black students, their diversity has increased over time. In 2015, students who were either white, Hispanic, Asian or Pacific Islander, or Native American made up 22% of total enrollment at HBCUs, compared with 15% in 1976.

In 2006, the National Center for Education Statistics released a study showing that HBCUs had a $10.2 billion positive impact on the nation's economy with 35% coming from the multiplier effect.

There are also developments in how African Americans may choose or not choose an HBCU. HBCUs are at risk of losing ground in terms of quality of their applicants as well. The current admission policies of predominately White institutions (PWIs) ensure that qualified applicants of any color are accepted and most top institutions actively recruit minority students. Well qualified minority students are often the target of frenzied competition (Cross, 2007). This competition is reflected in the inducements offered by PWIs to qualified Black applicants, most notably monetary incentives, which many students and their parents find too attractive to pass up. For this reason and others, fewer Black undergraduates are choosing to attend HBCUs, this figure has gradually declined to 22% as of 2002 (U.S. Department of Education, 2004). This dwindling percentage, coupled with opportunities at PWIs, have led some to speculate whether the HBCU has outlived its purpose and lost its relevance for Black youth (Lemelle, 2002; Sowell 1993; Suggs, 1997b).

Racial diversity post-2000
Following the enactment of Civil Rights laws in the 1960s, many educational institutions in the United States that receive federal funding have undertaken affirmative action to increase their racial diversity. Some historically black colleges and universities now have non-black majorities, including West Virginia State University and Bluefield State University, whose student bodies have had large white majorities since the mid-1960s.

As many HBCUs have made a concerted effort to maintain enrollment levels and often offer relatively affordable tuition, the percentage of non–African-American enrollment has risen. The following table highlights HBCUs with high non–African American enrollments:

Other HBCUs with relatively high non–African American student populations

According to the U.S. News & World Report Best Colleges 2011 edition, the proportion of white American students at Langston University was 12%; at Shaw University, 12%; at Tennessee State University, 12%; at the University of Maryland Eastern Shore, 12%; and at North Carolina Central University, 10%. The U.S. News & World Reports statistical profiles indicate that several other HBCUs have relatively significant percentages of non–African American student populations consisting of Asian, Hispanic, white American, and foreign students.

Special academic programs
HBCU libraries have formed the HBCU Library Alliance. That alliance, together with Cornell University, have a joint program to digitize HBCU collections. The project is funded by the Andrew W. Mellon Foundation. Additionally, more historically black colleges and universities are offering online education programs. As of November 23, 2010, nineteen historically black colleges and universities offer online degree programs. The growth in these programs is driven by partnerships with online educational entrepreneurs like Ezell Brown.

Intercollegiate sports

NCAA Division I has two historically black athletic conferences: Mid-Eastern Athletic Conference and Southwestern Athletic Conference. The top football teams from the conferences have played each other in postseason bowl games: the Pelican Bowl (1970s), the Heritage Bowl (1990s), and the Celebration Bowl (2015–present). These conferences are home to all Division I HBCUs except for Hampton University and Tennessee State University. Tennessee State has been a member of the Ohio Valley Conference since 1986, while Hampton left the MEAC in 2018 for the Big South Conference. In 2021, North Carolina A&T State University made the same conference move that Hampton made three years earlier (MEAC to Big South). Both Hampton and North Carolina A&T later moved their athletic programs to the Colonial Athletic Association and its technically separate football league of CAA Football; Hampton joined both sides of the CAA in 2022, while A&T joined the all-sports CAA in 2022 before joining CAA Football in 2023.

The mostly HBCU Central Intercollegiate Athletic Association and Southern Intercollegiate Athletic Conference are part of the NCAA Division II, whereas the HBCU Gulf Coast Athletic Conference is part of the National Association of Intercollegiate Athletics.

Notable HBCU alumni

 
HBCUs have a rich legacy of matriculating many leaders in the fields of business, law, science, education, military service, entertainment, art, and sports.

 Alcee Hastings, US Congressman from Florida's 20th congressional district – Fisk University, Howard University, Florida A&M University
 Alice Walker, novelist and poet – Spelman College
 Althea Gibson, the first African American to win a Grand Slam title had a full athletic scholarship to Florida A&M University
 Anika Noni Rose, the original voice of the first African American Disney princess (Tiana) - Florida A&M University  
Ben Wallace, former 4-time NBA All-Star and NBA Defensive Player of the Year - Virginia Union University
 Claude McKay, poet, Tuskegee University
Doug Williams, first black NFL quarterback to win Superbowl - Grambling State
Ed Bradley, first black White House correspondent for CBS News - Cheyney University of Pennsylvania
Edward Brooke, first African-American elected by popular vote to United States Senate and to serve as Massachusetts Attorney General - Howard University
 James Clyburn, US Congressman from South Carolina's 6th congressional district and Majority Whip of the 116th United States Congress – South Carolina State University
Jerry Rice, considered the greatest NFL wide receiver of all-time - Mississippi Valley State
 NASA mathematician Katherine Johnson attended West Virginia State College (now West Virginia State University). 
 Leon H. Sullivan, developer of the Sullivan Principles used to end apartheid in South Africa, attended West Virginia State College (now West Virginia State University).
 Lonnie Johnson, inventor, NASA engineer – Tuskegee University
Medgar Wiley Evers - civil rights leader - Alcorn State University
Megan Thee Stallion, Grammy-winning rapper and actress - Texas Southern
 Nikki Giovanni, poet – Fisk University
Randy Jackson, original judge on American Idol - Southern University
 Ralph Abernathy, civil rights activist, minister – Clark Atlanta University, Alabama State University
 Rod Paige, first African-American to serve as the U.S. education chief - Jackson State University 
 Astronaut Dr. Ronald McNair graduated from North Carolina A&T State University. 
 Roscoe Lee Browne, prolific actor and director, graduated from Lincoln University. Browne occasionally returned to Lincoln between 1946 and 1952 to teach English, French and comparative literature. 
Toni Braxton, Grammy-winning R&B artist with over 70 million records sold - Bowie State
Tom Joyner, first African-American inducted into the National Radio Hall of Fame - Tuskegee University
 The Tuskegee Airmen were educated at Tuskegee University.
 Walter Payton, considered one of the greatest running backs in NFL history – Jackson State University
 Wanda Sykes, Emmy-winning comedian, novelist, and writer – Hampton University

Modern presidential and federal support
Federal funding for HBCUs has notably increased in recent years.  Proper federal support of HBCUs has become more of a key issue in modern U.S. presidential elections.

In President Barack Obama eight years in office, he invested more than $4 billion to HBCUs.

In 2019, President Donald Trump signed a bipartisan bill that permanently invested more than $250 million a year to HBCUs.

In 2021, President Joe Biden’s first year in office, he invested a historic $5.8 billion to support HBCUs.  In 2022, Biden's administration announced an additional $2.7 billion through his American Rescue Plan.

HBCU Buzz
HBCU Buzz is a popular media platform primarily about HBCUs. Its coverage focuses on telling the stories of HBCUs across the nation, highlighting their culture, and recognizing the achievements of HBCU-educated individuals. Established in 2011, HBCU Buzz serves as a resource tool for prospective students, current students, and alumni of HBCUs. HBCU Buzz organizes the annual HBCU Top 30 Under 30 Awards, to celebrate the achievements of alumni of HBCU in various fields of endeavors such as politics, public service, technology, entertainment, entrepreneurship, fashion, health, education and money.

HBCU homecomings
Homecoming is a tradition at almost every American college and university, however homecoming has a more important meaning at HBCUs. Homecoming plays a significant role in the culture and identity of HBCUs.  Also the level of pageantry present and the Black local community involvement (parades, business vendors, etc) makes HBCU homecomings more unique. Millions of alumni, students, celebrity guests, and visitors attend HBCU homecomings every year.   In addition to being a highly cherished tradition in the HBCU community, homecomings generate strong revenue for HBCUs and many Black businesses.

See also

 Black Ivy League
HBCU band
 Honda Battle of the Bands
 Minority-serving institution
National Museum of African American History and Culture
 Thurgood Marshall College Fund
 United Negro College Fund

References

Further reading

External links

 National Center for Education Statistics' College Navigator information about HBCUs

 
Universities and colleges in the United States by type
African Americans and education